Tsikada ( meaning cicada), was a Soviet satellite navigation system including ten Low Earth Orbit (LEO) satellites. It transmits the same two carrier frequencies as the U.S. TRANSIT satellite system. The first satellite was launched in 1974.

See also
Tsiklon
Parus
GLONASS

References

External links
 Tsikada on the Encyclopedia Astronautica

Navigation satellites of the Soviet Union
Satellite navigation systems
Communications in the Soviet Union
Satellite constellations